Echium  is a genus of approximately 70 species and several subspecies of flowering plant in the family Boraginaceae.

Species of Echium are native to North Africa, mainland Europe to Central Asia, and the Macaronesian islands where the genus reaches its maximum diversity. 29 species of Echium are endemic to the Canary, Madeira, and Cape Verde archipelagos. The continental species are herbaceous, whereas all but two of the endemic species of the Macaronesian islands are woody perennial shrubs.

Etymology
The Latin genus name echium comes from the Greek  echion referring to Echium plantagineum and itself deriving from  echis "viper"; the Greek term dates to Dioscorides who noted a resemblance between the shape of the nutlets to a viper's head. The genus Echium was published by Carl Linnaeus in 1753.

Cultivation and uses
Many species are used as ornamental and garden plants and may be found in suitable climates throughout the world.

In Crete, Echium italicum is called pateroi (πάτεροι) or voidoglosses (βοϊδόγλωσσες) and its tender shoots are eaten boiled or steamed.

Echium species are used as food plants by the larvae of some Lepidoptera species including Coleophora onosmella and orange swift.

Echium seed oil

The seed oil from Echium plantagineum contains high levels of alpha linolenic acid (ALA), gamma linolenic acid (GLA) and stearidonic acid (SDA), making it valuable in cosmetic and skin care applications, with further potential as a functional food, as an alternative to fish oils. However, despite its high ALA content, echium seed oil does not increase docosahexaenoic acid (DHA) and eicosapentaenoic acid (EPA) levels.

Invasiveness
Some species have been widely naturalized in Mediterranean climates, including South Africa, Australia, New Zealand and parts of South America and the United States. For example, Echium plantagineum has become a major invasive species in Australia.

Species

Echium acanthocarpum Svent.
Echium aculeatum Poir.
Echium albicans Lag. & Rodr.
Echium amoenum  Fisch. & C.A.Mey
Echium anchusoides Bacch., Brullo & Selvi
Echium angustifolium Lam.
Echium arenarium Guss.
Echium asperrimum Lam.
Echium auberianum Webb & Berthel. 
Echium bethencourtii Santos.
Echium biebersteinii Lacaita.
Echium boissieri Steud.
Echium bonnetii Coincy.
Echium brevirame Sprague & Hutch.
Echium callithyrsum Webb ex Bolle.
Echium candicans L.f.
Echium canum Emb. & Maire
Echium clandestinum Pomel
Echium creticum L.
Echium decaisnei Webb & Berthel.
Echium flavum Desf.
Echium gaditanum Boiss.
Echium giganteum L.f.
Echium glomeratum Poir.
Echium handiense Svent.
Echium hierrense Webb ex Bolle
Echium horridum Batt.
Echium humile Desf.
Echium hypertropicum Webb.
Echium italicum L.
Echium judaeum Lacaita.
Echium khuzistanicum Mozaff.
Echium × lemsii G.Kunkel.
Echium leucophaeum Webb ex Sprague & Hutch.
Echium × lidii G.Kunkel
Echium longifolium Delile.
Echium lusitanicum L.
Echium modestum Ball.
Echium nervosum W.T. Aiton
Echium onosmifolium Webb & Berthel.
Echium orientale L.
Echium pabotii Mouterde.
Echium parviflorum Moench
Echium petiolatum Barratte & Coincy.
Echium pininana Webb et Berthel.
Echium pitardii A.Chev.
Echium plantagineum L.
Echium portosanctense J.A.Carvalho, Pontes, Bat.-Marques & R.Jardim
Echium rauwolfii Delile.
Echium rosulatum Lange
Echium rubrum Forssk.
Echium sabulicola Pomel.
Echium salmanticum Lag.
Echium simplex DC.
Echium spurium Lojac.
Echium stenosiphon Webb.
Echium strictum L.f.
Echium suffruticosum Barratte.
Echium sventenii Bramwell.
Echium x taibiquense P.Wolff & Rosinski.
Echium tenue Roth.
Echium thyrsiflorum Masson ex Link.
Echium triste Svent.
Echium trygorrhizum Pomel.
Echium tuberculatum Hoffmanns. & Link.
Echium velutinum Coincy.
Echium virescens DC.
Echium vulcanorum A.Chev.
Echium vulgare L.
Echium webbii Coincy.
Echium wildpretii Pears. ex Hook. fil.

References 

 
Boraginaceae genera
Taxa named by Carl Linnaeus